Sasang may also refer to:

 Sasang District, located in Busan, South Korea
 Sasang Station (disambiguation), stations in Busan, South Korea.
 Sasang station (Korail)
 Sasang station (Busan Metro)
 Sasang (village), located in Chehel Chay Rural District, Iran

See also
 Sasang typology